Vårgårda Municipality is a municipality in Västra Götaland County in western Sweden. Its seat is located in the town of Vårgårda. It borders Alingsås Municipality to the west, Herrljunga Municipality to the east, Essunga Municipality to the north, Bollebygd and Borås Municipalities to the south.

The local government reform of 1952 formed this municipality through the amalgamation of many small municipalities. It got its name from the only larger built-up locality in the area, Vårgårda. Its territory was not affected by the reform of 1971.

The Swedish religious revival in the 19th century was strong in Vårgårda Municipality, and the Christian climate is today dispersed in many denominations.

Several nationwide-recognized companies, such as Autoliv, are located in the municipality.

Localities
The seat Vårgårda, situated between Alingsås and Herrljunga, is the largest locality in this predominantly rural area. Horla and Östadkulle are two other localities, both with fewer than 500 inhabitants in 2018.

References

External links

Official site

Municipalities of Västra Götaland County
North Älvsborg